Nicolás Gómez (born 25 February 1996) is an Argentine professional footballer who plays as a midfielder for Ferro Carril Oeste.

Career
Gómez started out with Primera B Nacional side Ferro Carril Oeste. His professional debut arrived during the 2016 season against Gimnasia y Esgrima on 18 June, as he came off the bench for Guillermo Vernetti after seventy-five minutes. He made his first start for the club in July 2017 during a defeat to All Boys.

Career statistics
.

References

External links

1996 births
Living people
Place of birth missing (living people)
Argentine footballers
Association football midfielders
Primera Nacional players
Ferro Carril Oeste footballers